A nanostructure is a structure of intermediate size between microscopic and molecular structures. Nanostructural detail is microstructure at nanoscale.

In describing nanostructures, it is necessary to differentiate between the number of dimensions in the volume of an object which are on the nanoscale. Nanotextured surfaces have one dimension on the nanoscale, i.e., only the thickness of the surface of an object is between 0.1 and 100 nm. Nanotubes have two dimensions on the nanoscale, i.e., the diameter of the tube is between 0.1 and 100 nm; its length can be far more. Finally, spherical nanoparticles have three dimensions on the nanoscale, i.e., the particle is between 0.1 and 100 nm in each spatial dimension. The terms nanoparticles and ultrafine particles (UFP) are often used synonymously although UFP can reach into the micrometre range. The term nanostructure is often used when referring to magnetic technology.

Nanoscale structure in biology is often called ultrastructure.

Properties of nanoscale objects and ensembles of these objects are widely studied in physics.

List of nanostructures

See also 

Nanomaterials
Nanotechnology
Tube-based nanostructures
List of software for nanostructures modeling
Nanocar
NanoPutian

References

External links 
 Applications of Nanoparticles

Nanomaterials